Sheikh Abdullah bin Isa bin Ali Al Khalifa (born in 1883, Muharraq, Bahrain, died in 1966) was a Bahraini politician, Cabinet Minister, and judge.

Biography
He was born the son of Sheikh Isa ibn Ali Al Khalifa in Muharraq in 1883 and raised by his grandmother with private tutors to educate him. When the municipality of Manama was founded in 1919, Sheikh Abdullah bin Isa was the first president of the municipal council, chairing it until 1929. He established the first regular schools in the country, including the first girls’ school in 1926 to the consternation of some conservatives. He began sending students on scholarship abroad in 1928 and was appointed the first Minister of Education in 1931. Appointed in 1938 as chief judge of the Court of Cassation that also included future Emir of Bahrain Sheikh Salman bin Hamad Al Khalifa I and Chief Adviser Charles Belgrave, Abdullah also replaced his brother Mohammed  as mayor of Muharraq, widening streets and improving markets among other reforms. He was an avid falconer and went on many hunting trips in Saudi Arabia. He died on April 23, 1966.

Personal life	
He had several wives, including Sheikha Hessa bint Salman bin Ibrahim Al Khalifa, who bore him the son Sheikh Isa (who had six children of his own, Khaled, Salman, Nasser, Ahmed, Kholoud, and Hessa); Shaqwa bint Shafi bin Salem Al Shafi, of the Al-Hawajir tribe; and Haya bint Abdul Muhsin bin Muhanna Khazar, of the Bani Khalid, with whom he had a son who died young after falling from horseback.

References

Bahraini politicians
House of Khalifa
1883 births
1966 deaths